Pierrepont Manor Complex is a national historic district located at Mannsville in Jefferson County, New York.  The district includes five contributing buildings.  They are the manor house (1826), carriage barn (1826), land office (1822), Zion Episcopal Church (1836) and its parish house and school (1856). The manor house is operated as a full-service wedding facility.

It was listed on the National Register of Historic Places in 1977.

References

External links
THE MANOR HOUSE: A full-service wedding facility

Historic districts on the National Register of Historic Places in New York (state)
Historic districts in Jefferson County, New York
National Register of Historic Places in Jefferson County, New York